Leptinopterus tibialis is a species of beetles belonging to the family Lucanidae.

Description
Males have well-developed mandibles, with several teeth of various sizes in the interior edges.

Distribution 
This quite rare species occurs in Argentina, Brazil and Paraguay.

References 

  2009: Description of two new species of Leptinopterus Hope (Coleoptera: Lucanidae: Lucaninae) with notes on the taxonomy and natural history of the genus. Zootaxa, 2172: 32–44. Abstract & excerpt
 Biolib
 Synopsis of the described Coleoptera of the World

External links 
 Coleoptera-neotropical
 Insect
 Kaefer-der-welt

tibialis
Lucaninae
Arthropods of Brazil
Arthropods of Argentina
Beetles described in 1822